Epidromia zephyritis is a moth of the family Noctuidae first described by Schaus in 1923. It is endemic to the Galápagos Islands.

Adults have a dark purplish-black ground colour.

References 

Calpinae
Endemic fauna of the Galápagos Islands
Moths of South America
Moths described in 1923